Michiyo (written: 道世, 道代, 路代, 真世, 充代, 通世, 迪与, 美千代, 実千代, 美智代, 美知依, 美知代, 三千代 or みちよ in hiragana) is a unisex Japanese given name. Notable people with the name include:

, Japanese manga artist
, Japanese actress
, Japanese baseball player
, Japanese singer and actress
, Japanese synchronized swimmer
Michiyo Fukaya (1953–1987), American poet and activist
, Japanese singer-songwriter
, Japanese high jumper
, Japanese volleyball player
, Japanese actress
Michiyo Kikuta, Japanese manga artist and creator of Mamotte! Lollipop
, Japanese actress and voice actress
, Japanese singer and voice actress
, Japanese actress
, Japanese politician
, Japanese footballer
, Japanese agricultural scientist and biochemist
, Japanese musician
, Japanese voice actress
, Japanese animator

Japanese unisex given names